Robert Crompton Handley (1881 – 4 February 1940) was a British politician and trade unionist.

Born in Bolton, Handley began working in a cotton mill as a half-timer at the age of ten.  He eventually became a spinner, and joined the Preston Operative Cotton Spinners' Association, being elected as its treasurer, then as its secretary.

Handley was also active in the Labour Party, and was elected to Preston Borough Council in 1923.  In 1934/5, he served as Mayor of Preston, the third Labour mayor of the town.  In 1936, he was elected as vice-chairman of the Amalgamated Association of Operative Cotton Spinners, and in 1938 he was also elected to the General Council of the Trades Union Congress.

Handley was also active internationally, attending the conferences of the International Labour Organization, at which he was particularly well known for his campaign for a maximum forty-hour working week.

References

1881 births
1940 deaths
Councillors in Lancashire
Labour Party (UK) councillors
British trade union leaders
Members of the General Council of the Trades Union Congress
People from Bolton
Trade unionists from Lancashire
Mayors of Preston, Lancashire